The SDP45 is a six-axle, C-C,  diesel-electric locomotive built by General Motors' Electro-Motive Division of La Grange, Illinois. It was a passenger-hauling version of the SD45 on a stretched locomotive frame with an extended, squared-off long hood at the rear, aft of the radiators, giving space for a steam generator for passenger train heating. This steam generator placement followed the pattern set by the SDP35 and SDP40.

Original owners
The Southern Pacific Railroad ordered their ten on May 9, 1966, with the units being placed in service between May 24 and July 26, 1967, initially on the City of San Francisco between Oakland and Ogden, and eventually used system-wide. The steam generator was a Vapor Model OK-4740. SP's units had Pyle National Gyralights on the leading end, came with Nathan P-3 horns, and cost $317,156 each (SP's straight SD45's from the same period cost $290,788 each). All except 3201 and 3207 would eventually be re-geared back to 62:15 once they entered commuter service. After Amtrak took over long-distance routes in 1971, various units were leased to Amtrak for West Coast service (primarily on the Coast Starlight) until Amtrak purchased their SDP40F locomotives, while the rest were used in freight service and on Company specials. Beginning in 1973 the SDP45s were used for commuter service on the San Francisco Peninsula Commute, replacing the Fairbanks-Morse Train Masters. SP's commuter service was demanding work and the locomotives required electrical modification to meet those demands. A "Passenger Start" switch was installed inside the cab electrical cabinet; in the "COMM" position the units were held in Parallel, in the "FRT/PASS" position normal transition was made. They stayed on the commute route (often working in freight service on weekends) until 1985 when Caltrain equipment arrived, and they were placed into freight service until their retirement, initially working out of Roseville, then in local and hauler service in the Los Angeles Basin. All were retired between 1986 (3208) and 1990 (3204) and sold for scrap.

The Great Northern Railway purchased eight SDP45s in 1967 to replace F-units on the Empire Builder. Normally paired back-to-back, they were also used singly leading F-units. These joined six smaller SDP40 locomotives ordered in 1966 for the Western Star. After the startup of Amtrak in 1971, Great Northern Railway successor Burlington Northern Railroad converted all fourteen SDP locomotives to freight service.

The Erie Lackawanna Railroad ordered 14 SDP45s in 1969 and 1970. Intended only for freight service, these units had standard (angled) long hood ends, and the extra space aft of the radiators had concrete ballast where a passenger unit would have a steam generator and venting. Their longer frames permitted a larger fuel tank which gave the locomotives a greater range between fuel stops.  EMD later redesignated these as SD45Ms.

Roster

Rebuilds 
One Burlington Northern Railroad SDP45 6599 was retrofitted with an articulated four-axle truck by EMD in 1983-84, converting it to an A1A-B+B wheel arrangement. The middle traction motor in the lead truck was removed and placed in the rear truck. The rear truck, called the HT-BB, for High Traction B+B arrangement, was tested successfully but advances in traction motors obviated the need for four-axle trucks. This testing was not related to the development of the HTCR three-axle radial truck first seen under EMD SD60s and SD60MACs and made standard on the early SD70 series.

Southern Pacific Railroad 8691-8696 were SD40M-3 rebuilds done by Morrison-Knudsen. They were ex-EL 3654, 3668, 3666, 3665, 3662, and 3659. It is this group that most surviving SDP45s belong to.

Preservation 
Erie Lackawanna Railroad 3639, later Conrail 6670, was listed as being preserved at the Virginia Museum of Transportation, although the museum's collection list does not show it. In August 2018, Youngstown Steel Heritage announced their intention to purchase 3639 and move it to their museum, with the goal of restoring it to operating condition, and eventually back to its original number and paint scheme. In September 2018, the group announced that they had successfully purchased the locomotive; however, the current status of the project is unknown as the related pages have since been taken down.

References 

 Shine, Joseph W. (1992). Great Northern Color Pictorial - Volume 2: Division Assignment, Second Generation Diesels, The Big Sky Blue Era. La Mirada, CA: Four Ways West Publications. 
 Strauss, John F. Jr. (1998). Great Northern Color Pictorial - Volume 5: Rocky's Robe of Many Colors. La Mirada, CA: Four Ways West Publications. 
 Sarberenyi, Robert. EMD SD45 and SDP45 Original Owners. Retrieved on August 27, 2006
 EMD's SD45 and SDP45 - Original Owners. Retrieved on May 27, 2009
 Preserved EMD Locomotives - All except Cab Units and Switchers. Retrieved on May 27, 2009.
 The Virginia Museum of Transportation - Railroad Collection. Retrieved on May 27, 2009.
 
 

C-C locomotives
SD45P
Passenger locomotives
Diesel-electric locomotives of the United States
Standard gauge locomotives of the United States